is a Japanese manga series written and illustrated by Sadayasu, with collaboration from Makoto Fukami. It was serialized in Shogakukan's seinen manga magazine Weekly Big Comic Spirits from March 2013 to August 2019, with its chapters collected in nineteen tankōbon volumes.

Publication
Written and illustrated by Sadayasu, with collaboration from Makoto Fukami, Ōsama-tachi no Viking was serialized in Shogakukan's seinen manga magazine Weekly Big Comic Spirits from March 4, 2013, to August 26, 2019. Shogakukan collected is chapters in nineteen tankōbon volumes, released from June 28, 2013, to September 30, 2019.

Volume list

Reception
Ōsama-tachi no Viking was one of the Jury Recommended Works at the 18th Japan Media Arts Festival in 2014. The series was nominated for the 8th Manga Taishō in 2015 and placed 9th with 35 points.

References

Further reading

External links
 

Seinen manga
Shogakukan manga
Works about computer hacking